Leonel Maciel (born 4 January 1989) is an Argentine handball player for Sporting CP and the Argentine national team.

He represented Argentina at the 2019 and 2021 World Championships.

Teams 
  Dorrego Handball (2005-2008) 
  Sociedad Alemana de Gimnasia de Los Polvorines (2008-2009)
  Octavio Pilotes Posada (2009-2011)
  SAG Ballester  (2012-2015)
  Club Balonmano Zamora (2015-2017)
  Club Deportivo Básico Balonmano Ciudad Encantada (2017-2021)
  Barcelona (2021-Act.)

Individual awards
2022 South and Central American Men's Handball Championship: Best goalkeeper

References

1989 births
Living people
Argentine male handball players
Expatriate handball players
Argentine expatriate sportspeople in Spain
Liga ASOBAL players
Handball players at the 2019 Pan American Games
Pan American Games medalists in handball
Pan American Games gold medalists for Argentina
Medalists at the 2019 Pan American Games
Handball players at the 2020 Summer Olympics
21st-century Argentine people
South American Games gold medalists for Argentina
South American Games silver medalists for Argentina
South American Games medalists in handball
Competitors at the 2018 South American Games
Competitors at the 2022 South American Games